Pahri Azhari (3 July 1962 – 23 April 2020) was an Indonesian politician. He was the Regent of Musi Banyuasin for 2008-2012 and elected again for 2012–2015. Previously, he was a member of the Musi Banyuasin Regency Parliament from the National Mandate Party, and was elected as Vice Regent of Musi Banyuasin for the 2007–2012 term to accompany Alex Noerdin. Because of Alex Noerdin resigned to run as a Candidate for Governor of South Sumatra, Pahri was appointed as Regent on July 29, 2008. He died because of traffic collision on 23 April 2020.

References 

1962 births
2020 deaths
Road incident deaths in Indonesia
People from Palembang